Bhomat (also referred to as Bhumat; Hindi: भोमट or भूमट) is a mountainous and forested area in southern Rajasthan, covering all or parts of the tehsils of Kotra, Jhadol and Kherwara in Udaipur district. During British rule, the region was also referred to as 'Hilly Tracts of Mewar'.

Name 
The name 'Bhomat' is based on the understanding that land tenures known as bhum were held by jagirdars in the region.
But as per details provided by Mewar State, Govt. of India accepted that the Rajputs who held villages in Bhomat were not Bhumias, but Jagirdars.

Geography 
It covers approximately .Geographically, Bhomat is divided in three sub-regions: its western area is called Bhader (Hindi: भाडेर), the central area is called Wakal (after the Wakal River; Hindi: वाकल) and the eastern area is called Khadak (Hindi: खड़क). Primary rivers of the Bhomat are Sabarmati, Vakal, and Som.

History 
Bhomat was originally ruled by the Bhil rulers. Rana Dayaldas Bhil, Rana Harpal Bhil and Poonja Bhil were the chief kings of Bhomat.

In the 15th century, Rana Kumbha is credited with building fortresses in the Bhomat region with the goal of containing revolts among the Bhils of the area. In the 16th century, the Bhomat region was the shelter for the Ranas of Mewar when times of military crises caused by the Mughals.Rajput Jagirdars had recognised suzerainty of the Maharana of Maewar and were paying cash tribute in form of dasoond and provided armed contingents of their quota at disposal of the Mewar State.

The Bhomat is recognised as a geographical or cultural region, but it was a unified political entity for only a short term - a century - under British paramountcy. Prior to accession of the Mewar State to the Republic of India in 1949, the region was ruled by several Rajput jagirdars, the important ones being: Jawas, Pahara, Madri, Thana, Chhani, Juda, Panarwa, Oghna, Umariya, Patia, Sarwan, and Nainbara. These Jagirdars were known as bhumias (i.e., ones holding a bhum land tenure) and owed only nominal allegiance to the Mewar State.
For approximately a century during British paramountcy over Mewar State, the Bhomat represented a political unit divided in two sub-divisions - Kherwara Bhomat to the east and Kotra Bhomat to the east.

Rajput Jagirdars of Bhomat region

Population 
Adivasis comprise the majority of the population in the Bhomat.

References 

Geography of Udaipur
Mewar